Sunil Kanoria is a Kolkata-based Indian businessman who co-founded Srei Infrastructure Finance. He has served as the president of ASSOCHAM.

Personal life 
Sunil was born in Kolkata in a Marwari family on 4 May 1965 to Hari Prasad Kanoria and Champa Devi Kanoria. Hemant Kanoria, Sanjeev Kanoria, Sujit Kanoria and Manisha Kanoria Lohia are his siblings. Sunil is married to Sunita and has two children, Anant Raj and Avani Shree.

Career 
Sunil co-founded Srei Infrastructure Finance Ltd. which started its operations in 1989 along with his brother Hemant Kanoria. Through Srei, he launched Quippo in 2002 as an equipment rental business. He was serving as vice chairman of Srei when Reserve Bank of India removed him along with the board, citing governance concerns and payment delays.

He was a nominated member to the 23rd council of the Institute of Chartered Accountants of India, but stepped down in 2021 during RBI's investigation of Srei. He has served on the boards of several companies.

In 2015, he succeeded Rana Kapoor as the president of The Associated Chambers of Commerce & Industry of India (ASSOCHAM)

References

External links 
 Srei Group Website

Indian industrialists
Businesspeople from Kolkata
1965 births
Living people